Ana Victoria García Obregón (born 18 March 1955), better known as Ana Obregón, is a Spanish actress, television presenter, celebrity and socialite. Obregón has appeared in European and American films but she is best known for her high-profile personal life and her career as a television actress, most notably for her performances in the Spanish television series A las once en casa and Ana y los 7.

Education
She obtained a Masters degree in biology (specializing in zoology) from the Universidad Complutense de Madrid.

Film appearances
She is best known to American audiences for her role as Bo Derek's sidekick in 1984's Bolero. She also starred in Jules Verne's Mystery on Monster Island (1981) and the 3-D action adventure film Treasure of the Four Crowns (1983) with Tony Anthony. She also appeared in an episode of Who's the Boss?, playing Ana, Tony Micelli's Italian cousin.

In the gossip press
A staple of the Spanish prensa rosa or gossip press, Obregón is also famous in Spain and Britain for a long relationship with Croatia striker Davor Šuker as well as a supposed liaison with the Real Madrid and England international football player David Beckham. This led to a spat with Beckham's wife Victoria who famously referred to the then 50-year-old as a "geriatric Barbie". Obregón later denied any sexual misconduct on her part, but sued instead.

Controversies
Obregón was one of Jeffrey Epstein's clients at his consulting firm, Intercontinental Assets Group Inc. (IAG). In 1982 Epstein, then a high-level bounty hunter, helped her to recover her father's millions in lost investments, which had disappeared when Drysdale Government Securities collapsed because of fraud.

Obregón found herself in the midst of controversy in 2007 following information disclosed by Interviú, and subsequently published by the major newspapers in Spain: according to said media, an ostensibly distraught Obregón allegedly called her bodyguard Eloy Sánchez Barba in order to ask him to hire third parties to beat up or physically assault journalist Jaime Cantinzano, in reprisal for what she deemed an unacceptable public exposure of her teenage son. According to these sources of information, she said: "...but I don't want this done by just anyone, I want you to have los Miami doing this", in reference to a well-known criminal group established mainly in Madrid. Unbeknownst to her and Sánchez Barba, the latter's telephone line had been tapped by the Spanish police in connection to their investigation of a hit job presumably coordinated by Sánchez Barba months before.

Private life
In 2020, she lost her only son, Alex Lequio, to cancer. In 2021, she also lost her mother to old age. Following the deaths of her mother and son, she exited the entertainment industry.

Selected filmography

Film

Television

References

External links

1955 births
Living people
Actresses from Madrid
Spanish film actresses
Association footballers' wives and girlfriends
Spanish television presenters
Complutense University of Madrid alumni
Spanish television actresses
OTI Festival presenters
Spanish women television presenters